Gollum is a wiki software using git as the back end storage mechanism, and written mostly in Ruby. It started life as the wiki system used by the GitHub web hosting system. Although the open source Gollum project and the software currently used to run GitHub wikis have diverged from one another, Gollum strives to maintain compatibility with the latter.

Formats supported 
Gollum wikis are simply Git repositories that adhere to a specific format. Gollum pages may be written in a variety of formats including Markdown, AsciiDoc, ReStructuredText, Creole and MediaWiki markup.

Features 
 YAML Frontmatter for controlling per-page settings
 UML diagrams via PlantUML
 BibTeX and citation support (when using Pandoc for rendering)
 Annotations using CriticMarkup
 Mathematics via MathJax
 Macros
 Redirects
 Support for Right-To-Left Languages

Editing 
Editing the pages can be done via the provided web interface, via its API or with a text editor directly in the git repository.

See also

 ikiwiki: Also uses a version control system to store pages
 Gitit (software): Git-based wiki software with similar features

References

External links 
 
 Documentation

GitHub
Free wiki software
Free software programmed in Ruby
Microsoft free software
Software using the MIT license
2009 software